is a Japanese footballer who plays for Honda FC.

Club career
On 10 January 2019, Yamafuji joined Honda FC.

Club statistics
Updated to 23 February 2020.

References

External links

Profile at Zweigen Kanazawa 

1986 births
Living people
Heisei International University alumni
Association football people from Tokyo
Japanese footballers
J2 League players
J3 League players
Japan Football League players
Zweigen Kanazawa players
Arte Takasaki players
Sony Sendai FC players
Giravanz Kitakyushu players
Honda FC players
Association football midfielders